Arthur Ochs "Pinch" Sulzberger Jr. (born September 22, 1951) is an American journalist.

Sulzberger was the chairman of The New York Times Company from 1997 to 2020, and the publisher of The New York Times from 1992 to 2018.

Early life and education 
Sulzberger was born in Mount Kisco, New York, one of two children of Barbara Winslow (née Grant) and Arthur Ochs "Punch" Sulzberger Sr. His sister is Karen Alden Sulzberger, who is married to author Eric Lax. He is a grandson of Arthur Hays Sulzberger and great-grandson of Adolph Ochs. His mother was a descendant of Mayflower crew member John Alden and Plymouth Colony governor Edward Winslow.
 
Sulzberger's mother was of mostly English and Scottish origin and his father was of German Jewish origin (both Ashkenazic and Sephardic).

Sulzberger's parents divorced when he was five years old. He was raised in his mother's Episcopalian faith; however, he no longer observes any religion.

Sulzberger graduated from the Browning School in New York City. In 1974, he received a Bachelor of Arts degree in political science from Tufts University.

Career
Sulzberger was a reporter with the Raleigh Times in North Carolina from 1974 to 1976, and a London Correspondent for the Associated Press in the United Kingdom from 1976 to 1978.

Sulzberger joined The New York Times in 1978 as a correspondent in the Washington, D.C. bureau. He moved to New York as a metro reporter in 1981, and was appointed assistant metro editor later that year.  Sulzberger is a 1985 graduate of the Harvard Business School's program for management development.

From 1983 to 1987, Sulzberger worked in a variety of business departments, including production and corporate planning. In January 1987, Sulzberger was named assistant publisher. A year later, Sulzberger was named deputy publisher, overseeing the news and business departments. In these capacities, Sulzberger was involved in planning the Times'''s automated color printing and distribution facilities in Edison, New Jersey, and at College Point, Queens, New York, as well as the creation of the six-section color newspaper.

Sulzberger became the publisher of The New York Times in 1992, and chairman of The New York Times Company in 1997, succeeding his father, Arthur Ochs Sulzberger. On December 14, 2017, he announced he would be ceding the post of publisher to his son, A. G. Sulzberger, effective January 1, 2018.

Sulzberger remained chairman of Times board until December 31, 2020, when he passed that position to his son as well.

Awards and honors
1996 - Tufts University Light on the Hill'' Award, Massachusetts
 2006 - SUNY New Paltz, New York awarded an honorary doctorate of humane letters to Arthur Sulzberger Jr., chairman and publisher of The New York Times.
2012 - National Book Award Literarian Award for Outstanding Service to the American Literary Community
2017 - CUNY School of Journalism Journalistic Achievement Award at the 10th Annual Awards for Excellence in Journalism, New York

Affiliations 
Sulzberger played a central role in the development of the Times Square Business Improvement District, officially launched in January 1992, serving as the first chairman of that civic organization.

Sulzberger helped to found and was a two-term chairman of the New York City Outward Bound organization, and currently serves on the board of the Mohonk Preserve.

Activism 
Sulzberger was opposed to the Vietnam War and was arrested at protest rallies in the 1970s.

Personal life 

Sulzberger married Gail Gregg in 1975, and the couple divorced in 2008. The couple have two children: a son, Arthur Gregg Sulzberger, and a daughter, Annie Sulzberger.

Sulzberger married Gabrielle Greene 2014, and the couple filed for divorce in 2020.

See also 
 New Yorkers in journalism

References

External links

The New York Times & 9/11: Arthur Ochs Sulzberger Jr. Interview (2001)

1951 births
Living people
American chairpersons of corporations
American former Protestants
American newspaper publishers (people)
American people of English descent
American people of German-Jewish descent
American people of Scottish descent
Associated Press reporters
Collegiate School (New York) alumni
Jewish American journalists
People from Mount Kisco, New York
The New York Times writers
The New York Times publishers
Tufts University School of Arts and Sciences alumni
Sulzberger family
Browning School alumni
21st-century American Jews